William Murray (October 1, 1803 – August 25, 1875) was an American banker and politician who served two terms as a United States representative from New York from 1851 to 1855.

Biography
Murray was born near Middletown, New York on October 1, 1803, a son of William Murray Sr. and Mary Ann (Beakes) Murray. His siblings included Ambrose S. Murray.

Early career 
William Murray attended the common schools, and was employed as a clerk in mercantile establishments, first in Middletown, and later in New York City. He subsequently engaged in a successful mercantile career in Goshen. In 1844, he was chosen as one of New York's presidential electors, and cast his ballot for the Democratic ticket of James K. Polk and George M. Dallas.

Congress 
In 1850, Murray was elected to the United States House of Representatives as a Democrat, representing New York in the 32nd Congress. He was reelected to the 33rd Congress and served from March 4, 1851, to March 3, 1855.

Later career and death 
After leaving Congress, Murray engaged in agricultural pursuits, and was an organizer of the Republican Party in New York. He served as president of the Goshen Bank from 1857 until his death.

Murray died in Goshen on August 25, 1875. He was interred at St. James' Episcopal Cemetery in Goshen.

Family
In 1837, Murray married Ellen Maria Matlack of New York City. They were married until his death, and their children included sons Henry (1841–1874), Robert (1843–1903), and William (1844–1897) and daughter Abbey (1846–1929), the wife of William D. Van Vliet.

References

External links

1803 births
1875 deaths
People from Middletown, Orange County, New York
Democratic Party members of the United States House of Representatives from New York (state)
New York (state) Republicans
People from Goshen, New York
19th-century American politicians
Members of the United States House of Representatives from New York (state)